Tribune is an unincorporated community within Crittenden County, Kentucky, United States. It was also known as Hills Chapel.

References

Unincorporated communities in Crittenden County, Kentucky
Unincorporated communities in Kentucky